Maharashtra Purana is a contemporary poetic chronicle of the Maratha invasions of Bengal.

Manuscript 
The palm-leaf manuscript in eleven folios was first discovered in 1904, at an exhibition held in Mymensingh, a town of East Bengal (now, Bangladesh) — Kedarnath Singha had chanced upon it while collecting biographies of regional poets. It remains the only extant manuscript and is conserved at the Manuscript Library of the Bengali Department of the University of Calcutta.

Editions 
In 1908, Byomakesh Mustafi edited the text for the first time; it was published in Sahitya Parishat Patrika with an introduction and accompanying notes. In 1924, Prof. J. N. Samaddar (of Patna University) published an abridged translation in English with a brief introduction and notes. In 1930, T. C. Dasgupta re-translated the chronicle to English, for a journal of the University of Calcutta.

An improved English translation—alongside a critical transliteration and commentary—was published by Edward C. Dimock and Pratul Chandra Gupta in 1965.

Author 
The Purana was written by one Gangaram, as mentioned in the text. It remains unknown whether the manuscript was penned by Gangaram himself or his scribe. Despite some speculations, nothing definite can be ascertained about the identity or life of the author. That the last line of the manuscript reads "Thus ends the first part of Maharashtra Puran [...]", it has been suggested that Gangaram had drafted more volumes of the Purana; however, Dimock and Gupta consider it to be unlikely.

Mustafi had believed Gangaram to be a contemporary writer from West Bengal—either of the three ravaged districts of Burdwan, Bankura, and Birbhum—going by his intensely realistic depictions of certain events and usage of endemic verb-forms. Kedarnath Sen challenged Mustafi the following year. Not only did he reject Mustafi's claim about the endemecity of such verb-forms to West Bengal but also claimed to have chanced upon Gangaram's descendants at a village in Mymensingh, where he discovered his other works.

Dimock and Gupta do not comment on the accuracies of either's arguments; however, they note that the manuscript contains many phrases and idioms common to East Bengal.

Date 
No evidence exists in aid of dating the text. A date in the Bengali calendar—Sanibar, 14th of Pous, saka 1672, sala 1158—is mentioned; it might have been the date of completion of composition (by Gangaram) or completion of copying (by scribe).

Form 
A long narrative poem of 716 lines, the meters vary in accordance with the context.

Legacy
Tapan Raychaudhuri uses the example of Maharashtra Purana to argue that premodern literary consciousness in Bengal did not register any memory of the Islamic Rule in Bengal as tyrannical or uniquely oppressive — such emotional affects would be only produced during the Indian independence movement in service of constructing an imagined national identity around Hinduism.

Notes

References

Bibliography

Further reading

Indian manuscripts
Bengali-language manuscripts
South Asian manuscripts